Basalia cucullatelloides is a moth of the family Erebidae first described by Michael Fibiger in 2008. It is known from south-central India.

Adults have been recorded in September.

The wingspan is 12–15 mm. The forewing is long, pointed and brownish and grey. The crosslines are double and black at the costa. The subterminal line is well marked and blackish, while the terminal line is marked by black interveinal dots. The hindwing is light greyish and the terminal line brown. The fringes are basally beige and there is an indistinct discal spot. The underside is brown. The antemedial and postmedial line are well marked on the forewing and there is a yellow costal streak and spots from the antemedial line to the apex. The underside of the hindwing is greyish with a discal spot.

References

Micronoctuini
Moths described in 2008